Sebastian Bergier (born 20 December 1999) is a Polish professional footballer who plays as a forward for GKS Katowice.

References

Living people
1999 births
Association football forwards
Polish footballers
Poland youth international footballers
Śląsk Wrocław players
Stal Mielec players
Wigry Suwałki players
GKS Katowice players
Ekstraklasa players
I liga players
II liga players
III liga players
Sportspeople from Wrocław